Salagena violetta is a moth in the family Cossidae. It is found in Malawi and possibly Tanzania.

References

Metarbelinae
Moths described in 1929